The 2010–11 Murray State Racers men's basketball team represented Murray State University in the 2010–11 college basketball season. This was head coach Billy Kennedy's fifth season at Murray State. The Racers competed in the Ohio Valley Conference and played their home games at the CFSB Center. They finished the season 23–8, 14–4 in OVC play to capture the regular season championship.

Roster

References

Murray State
Murray State
Murray State Racers men's basketball seasons
Murray State Racers men's basketball, 2010-11
Murray State Racers men's basketball, 2010-11